Al-Radhai is a sub-district located in Al Udayn District, Ibb Governorate, Yemen. Al-Radhai had a population of 2491 as of 2004.

References 

Sub-districts in Al Udayn District